Gujarat Lokayukta is the Parliamentary Ombudsman for the state of Gujarat (India). It is a high level statutory functionary,  created to address grievances of the public against ministers, legislators, administration and public servants in issues related to misuse of power, mal-administration and corruption. It was first formed under the Gujarat Lokayukta and Upa-Lokayukta Act, and approved by the president of India on 1986. The passage of Lokpal and Lokayukta's Act,2013 in Parliament had become law from January 16,2014 and requires each state to appoint its Lokayukta within a year.  A bench of Lokayukta should consist of judicial and non-judicial members. An Upa-Lokayukta is a deputy to Lokayukta and assists him in his work and acts in-charge Lokayukta in case the position fells vacant before time.

A Lokayukta of the state is appointed to office by the state Governor after consulting the committee consisting of State Chief Minister, Speaker of Legislative Assembly, Leader of Opposition, Chairman of Legislative Council and Leader of Opposition of Legislative Council and cannot be removed from office except for reasons specified in the Act and will serve the period of five years.

History and administration 

Gujarat Lokayukta and Upa-Lokayukta was approved by its Legislative Assembly in 1986. Gujarat Lokayukta bill was passed with amendments in year 2013 but was not accepted by Governor as the bill made provision for a six member committee headed by Chief Minister to appoint Lokayukta. Gujarat Governor had appointed the Lokayukta in 2013 after consulting the serving Chief Justice of Gujarat High Court but was not accepted by the State Government. Later the Supreme Court of India upheld the appointment but the appointed Lokayukta Mr Justice (retd) R A Mehta did not take the charge.

Oath or affirmation

Powers 

Lokayukta for the state of Gujarat has got powers to investigate complaints of corruption by the general public against public
officials such as the chief minister of state, deputy CM of the state,
chancellor and others mentioned in the Act. Gujarat Lokayukta Act says that Lokayukta has independent powers to investigate and prosecute any government official or public servants of all grades, who are covered by the act and against whom the complaint is received for abusing his authority for self interest or causes hurt to anyone or any action done intentionally or following corrupt practices negatively impacting the state or individual.

Appointment and tenure 

Justice (retd.) Rajesh H Shukla, an ex-judge of Gujarat High Court was appointed as the  fifth Lokayukta for the State of Gujarat.

In 2013, Justice (Retired) R A Mehta though appointed as Lokayukta of the state refused to take charge due to differences with the State Government.

Related articles 

Lokayukta

Lokpal and Lokayukta Act,2013

Delhi Lokayukta

Himachal Pradesh Lokayukta

Madhya Pradesh Lokayukta

References

External links 
 official website

Gujarat
Lokayuktas